Ryan Burroughs (born August 26, 1991) is an American professional rugby football player who has played primarily rugby league he has represented the United States National Rugby League team in the 2017 Rugby League World Cup, as well as the 2019 Rugby League World Cup 9's. He last played rugby league for Barrow Raiders. He left the club to sign for rugby union's Major League Rugby side Old Glory DC.

Burroughs is a United States national rugby league team representative.

Early life
Burroughs played high school football as a running back and wide receiver for Liberty High School in northern Virginia. After serving in the United States Army, he briefly played rugby union for a local club in Virginia, before joining the Northern Virginia Eagles of the USA Rugby League in 2015.

Senior career
Burroughs scored five tries during his rugby league debut match against the Bucks County Sharks. He finished the season with 33 tries from 10 games, and was selected to represent the United States in their two-match Colonial Cup series against Canada later in the year, scoring one try in the first match, and two tries in the second. In December 2015, Burroughs played in both of the US' 2017 World Cup qualifying matches against Jamaica and Canada, scoring a try against Canada.

Burroughs moved to Australia to play for the Wentworthville Magpies in 2016. Initially playing in the Sydney Shield, Burroughs was promoted to the Magpies' Ron Massey Cup team during the season. In October 2016, Burroughs signed with the newly established Toronto Wolfpack for their inaugural season in 2017. He made his debut for the Wolfpack in their 2017 Challenge Cup match against Siddal, scoring the club's first ever competitive try.

In March 2018, Burroughs was sent on loan, along with Wolfpack teammate Quinn Ngawati, to League 1 side London Skolars for the remainder of the 2018 season. Later that year, Burroughs moved to the Barrow Raiders in the Championship.

DC Cavalry
In April 2021 the professional twelve team North American Rugby League (NARL) was launched, with Burroughs being announced as Founder/Owner of Eastern Conference team the D.C. Cavalry (based in Washington, D.C.).

On 20 Sep 2021 it was reported that Ryan had coached DC Cavalry in the inaugural Canada Cup fixture versus Toronto Wolfpack.

References

External links
Toronto Wolfpack profile
RLWC profile
Washington D.C. Cavalry Rugby League Instagram

1991 births
Living people
American rugby league players
Barrow Raiders players
London Skolars players
Northern Virginia Eagles players
Old Glory DC players
People from Manassas, Virginia
Rugby league fullbacks
Toronto Wolfpack players
United States Army soldiers
United States national rugby league team players
Washington DC Cavalry coaches
Wentworthville Magpies players